Zhangguozhuang is a station on Line 14 of the Beijing Subway. It is the western terminus of Line 14. This station opened on May 5, 2013.

Station Layout 
The station has 2 elevated side platforms.

Exits 
There are 2 exits, lettered A and B. Both are accessible.

References

Railway stations in China opened in 2013
Beijing Subway stations in Fengtai District